Washington School is a building in Grand Forks, North Dakota that was built in 1907.  It was listed on the National Register of Historic Places in 1992.

It was designed by William J. Edwards in Classical Revival style, and was built by contractors Melby & Standahl.  Rusticated limestone forming walls of the basement level is the only true stone used in the building; the ornamental details on the upper stories are made of cast stone.

References

School buildings on the National Register of Historic Places in North Dakota
Schools in Grand Forks County, North Dakota
Neoclassical architecture in North Dakota
School buildings completed in 1907
Defunct schools in North Dakota
National Register of Historic Places in Grand Forks, North Dakota
1907 establishments in North Dakota